Gohad Assembly constituency is one of the 230 Vidhan Sabha (Legislative Assembly) constituencies of Madhya Pradesh state in central India. This constituency is reserved for the candidates belonging to the Scheduled castes. It came into existence in 1951, as Gohad Mehgaon, one of the 79 Vidhan Sabha constituencies of the erstwhile Madhya Bharat state.

Overview
Gohad (constituency number 13) is one of the 5 Vidhan Sabha constituencies located in Bhind district. This constituency covers the entire Mau Tehsil and Gohad tehsil of the district.

Gohad is part of Bhind Lok Sabha constituency along with seven other Vidhan Sabha segments, namely, Ater, Bhind, Lahar and Mehgaon in this district and Sewda, Bhander and Datia in Datia district.

Members of Legislative Assembly
As Gohad Mehgaon, a constituency of Madhya Bharat:
 1951: Ram Dhan, Indian National Congress / Prabhu, Indian National Congress
As a constituency of Madhya Pradesh:
 1977: Bhurelal, Janata Party
 1980: Shriram Jatav, Bharatiya Janata Party
 1985: Chaturbhuj Bhadkariya, Indian National Congress
 1990: Shriram Jatav, Bharatiya Janata Party
 1993: Chaturilal Barahadiya, Bahujan Samaj Party
 1998: Lal Singh Arya, Bharatiya Janata Party
 2003: Lal Singh Arya, Bharatiya Janata Party
 2008: Makhan Lal Jatav, Indian National Congress
 2009 (By-election): Ranvir Jatav, Indian National Congress
2013: Lal Singh Arya, Bharatiya Janata Party
2018: Ranvir Jatav, Indian National Congress

See also
 Gohad

References

Bhind district
Assembly constituencies of Madhya Pradesh